Ratnapura ("City of Gems" in Sinhala and Tamil) is a major city in Sri Lanka. It is the capital city of Sabaragamuwa Province, as well as the Ratnapura District, and is a traditional centre for the Sri Lankan gem trade. Ratnapura is also spelled as Rathnapura.

The name 'Ratnapura' is a Sanskrit word meaning "city of gems", from the Sanskrit words pura (town) and ratna (gemstone). Over 2000 years ago, when the first Buddhist monks arrived here from the north eastern provinces of India namely Bodh-Gaya, Varanasi and Pataliputra, they not only brought with them the Buddhist religion, but since their teachings were mainly in Sanskrit and Pali they also influenced the local language. While candy produced from the jaggery palm is traditionally known in this region as ratnapura, it is more likely that the candy was named for the locale rather than vice versa.

It is the centre of a long-established industry of precious stone mining including rubies, sapphires, and other gems. Apart from gem mining, the city is known for the production of rice and fruit. Large plantations of tea and rubber surround the city. Tea grown in this region is called low-country tea. There is a well-established tourism industry in Ratnapura. Nearby Sinharaja Forest Reserve, Udawalawe National Park, Kitulgala, and Adam's Peak are especially popular among tourists.

In 1901, the town of Ratnapura had a population of 4,084, and by 2012, it had increased to 46,229, with Buddhists, Hindus, Christians and Muslims each constituting a significant portion of the population.

Political 

The city is governed by a municipal council headed by a mayor. The council is elected by popular vote and has 15 seats. There were 29,159 registered voters in the 2006 local authorities elections.

Health  
Ratnapura hospital, upgraded to a Teaching Hospital in early 2019, is equipped with three surgical units, three medical units, two orthopedic units, three Obstetrics and gynaecology units, two paediatrics units, an ENT unit, a neurology unit, a neurosurgical unit, a rheumatology unit, a urosurgical unit, a nephrology unit with dialysing facilities,  a dermatology unit, a psychiatric unit, an A&E unit, and a cardiology unit. It has theatre facilities for routine surgeries, and for 24/7 casualties. It also has two ICU units catering 12 ICU beds at the moment. It is also a post graduate training center for surgical and paediatric pg trainees. It was upgraded as a teaching hospital, with the establishment of Medical faculty in Sabaragamuwa university.

Economy

Gem trade
The people of the town depend on the gem trade. Gem pits are common sights in the surrounding area. Most of the large-scale gem businessmen of Sri Lanka operate from Ratnapura. There are considerable numbers of foreign gem traders in the city too who have recognised the value of the gems found there. Among the foreign traders, Thai (Thailand) traders are in the majority. Every day, a large number of traders from suburbs and other towns gather in the town centre to sell or buy gemstones. Large-scale merchants collect gemstones from locals and sell them in the international market. Some traders go out of the city to buy gems. This includes neighboring towns like Kalawana, Bogawantalawa, and Ela-era. After the discovery of world-class alluvial sapphire deposits in the valley of Ilakaka in Madagascar, many Ratnapura merchants travel out of the country to Madagascar to buy gems. There are three main Gem market places in Ratnapura ."Abagahamula Gem Market ","Clock Tower Gem Market ","Demuwamawatha Gem Market " These markets operate in different hours in the day

Agriculture 

The city's agricultural industry is also well developed. Large plantations of tea and rubber surround the town. Although rice fields also used to be a common sight around the town, rice cultivation presently faces an uncertain future in Ratnapura because many farmers are giving up their rice cultivation and switching to gem mining which is a more productive way of earning money. If many farmers give up on agriculture, it would be harder for farmers to harvest enough food for them and to trade in the markets. Many delicious fruits (like mango and papaya) and vegetables are grown as market products.

Transport 

Ratnapura city is located in the A4 Highway which connects capital Colombo to Kalmunai in the Eastern Province.  Another Highway A8 connects the town with Panadura in the western coast of Sri Lanka.  During the British occupation of the Island, narrow gauge train track was laid in 1912 connecting Colombo – Avissawella – Ratnapura – Opanayake however line Avissawella onwards removed in 1976.  Thus reducing the mode of transportation to road.
In 2006, construction started on a new broad gauge railway line to Rathnapura only.
In 2014, the government gave approval to the  E06 Ruwanpura Expressway which will connect Rathnapura with Sri Lanka's Expressway Network. Work on the expressway began in 2021, with the first section to be completed by the end of 2023.

Climate 
Ratnapura features a tropical rainforest climate under the Köppen climate classification. The city is located in the south-western part of Sri Lanka, the so-called wet zone. The town receives rainfall mainly from south-western monsoons from May to September. During the remaining months of the year, there is also considerable precipitation due to convective rains.

Floods 

Much of the city of Ratnapura is situated in the flood plain of the Kalu River. As a result, it experiences regular floods, usually during the month of May. There are no large-scale dams upstream on the Kalu to control Spring runoff. Proposals to reduce flood risk in the city have yet to reach the feasibility stage. In May 2003, the town experienced the largest flood since the independence of Sri Lanka from Britain in 1947.

Places of worship 

There are a number of places of worship in and around Ratnapura, including:

Maha Saman Devalaya – a shrine dedicated to the god Saman. The god Saman is (a Buddhist deity) considered to be the guardian of Ratnapura. When the Portuguese captured Ratnapura, the ancient shrine that stood at this location was destroyed and a Portuguese church was constructed on top of it. When the Kandyan kingdom recaptured Ratnapura, the Portuguese church was destroyed and the shrine was rebuilt. Although there is no direct evidence to support the existence of the old shrine, indirect evidence supports the existence of a shrine that looked like a Hindu temple at the current location before Portuguese times. Currently this shrine is a very important place for Buddhists.
 Saints Peter and Paul's Cathedral – The history of Catholics in Ratnapura begins with Portuguese rule in Ratnapura. Very few Catholics lived in the town in the 17th century. Many of them are the descendants of Portuguese and locals that they married. There is evidence to suggest that the Portuguese built a church on top of a destroyed Buddhist temple. That Portuguese church was destroyed when the Kandyan kingdom recaptured Ratnapura from the Portuguese. The current church was built in a different location along the main street of Ratnapura (inside the town). The Church building being used now is said to be inspired by St. Joseph Vaz (Apostle of Ceylon) during the 17th century when he visited Ratnapura as a part of his apostolic mission to Sabaragamuwa. After Sabaragamuwa became a diocese on 2 November 1995 SS. Peter-Paul's Church was raised to the status of the Cathedral of the diocese.
 Pothgul Viharaya  - Rathnapura Pothgul Rajamaha Viharaya (පොත්ගුල් විහාරය) is a picturesque cave temple built on top of a hill believed to be built by king Vatta Gamini Abhaya better known as king Walagamba (89-77 BC) in the 1st century. It had been renovated during the days of King Kirthi Sri Rajasinghe (1747 – 1781) of the Kandy period. There are two temples belonging to these two periods within the Pothgul Viharaya. 
 St. Luke's Church (Church of England)
 Siva Temple (Hindu)

Sri Pada (Adam's Peak) 

Ratnapura is the starting point for the 'classic' or hard route up Adam's Peak, via the Gilimale and Carney Estates. The pilgrimage season starts on Poya (full moon) day in December and runs until the start of the south-west monsoon in April. It has been a pilgrimage centre for over 1,000 years. King Parakramabahu and King Nissanka Malla of Polonnaruwa provided ambalamas or 'resting places' for weary pilgrims along the mountain route. The other more popular route is through Dalhousie (pronounced 'Del-house') close to Dickoya.

Religion 

Ratnapura town has a Buddhist majority (52.88%) and a significant Muslim population (33.52%) .

Education 
Schools in Ratnapura include:

 Convent of Infant Jesus
 Dharmapala Maha Vidyalaya
 Ferguson High School
 Kalawana National School
 Malwala Navodya School
 Mihindu Vidyalaya
 Prince College, Ratnapura
 Rambuka eVillage School
 Sivali Central College
 St. Aloysius College
 St. Luke's College  
 Sumana Balika Vidyalaya
 Sumana Central College
 Sumana Saman Maha Vidyalaya
 Sussex College
 Lyceum Ratnapura 
 Ratnapura Tamil Maha Vidyalayam                       
Sri Sumana Maha Vidyalaya. Ratnapura.
Gallella Maha Vidyalaya.Gallella. Ratnapura.
Siduhath Vidyalaya. Galaboda, Ratnapura.

Attractions

Waterfalls
Rajanawa Ella (රජනෑ ඇල්ල) – a  waterfall located adjacent to the Ratnapura–Kalawana road, at the village of Marapana. The scenery around the waterfall has been captured in several Sinhala films.

Gem mines 
There are numerous gem mines located around the area, especially in paddy fields on lower ground. Portable hand operating tools used for the mining process, include shovels, picks, pans (specially made from bamboo) and cradles. Once the soil is extracted from the mine, water is used to wash the dirt and mud away using pans and any gemstones, which heavier than normal stones, will remain at the bottom of the pan.

Local heroes

Ehelepola Nilame
In the time of the Last king of Sri Lanka "Sri Vikrama Rajasinha",  Ehelepola Nilame was sent to Sabaragamuwa (Ratnapura) as "Disawe" or local governor of Sabaragamuwa. He built a small reservoir and water canal to support local rice farms. The works of this hero are still visible around the Ratnapura area and local people benefiting from his works even today.
His house which is  situated in the middle of Ratnapura city is now being used as the national museum building.

The portrayal of Ehelepola as a hero is quite controversial. Once he conspired with British and betrayed the Kandy king. The King ordered the execution of his family unless Ehelepola surrendered to the king (according to the prevailing laws). He became a coward and he let king execute his whole family in Kandy. His younger son became a child hero by bravely facing death by guillotine, while his elder brother was hiding behind his mother (who was drowned).

Maps
Detailed map of Ratnapura and Sri Lanka

References

External links 

 Statistics of 2001 Census of Sri Lanka
 Catholic Diocese of Ratnapura
 Statistics of 2001 Census of Sri Lanka
 Department of elections Sri Lanka
 Weather Forecast Ratnapura
 Maha Saman Devale, Ratnapura
 The Portuguese Cultural Imprint on Sri Lanka
 The Portuguese in Sri Lanka (1505-1658)
 Ilakaka, Madagascar, Geological data and history, sapphire rush
 Ratnapura to Adam's Peak
Gem Market Ratnapura

 
Provincial capitals in Sri Lanka
Jewellery districts
Populated places in Sabaragamuwa Province